

The Moravian Sun Inn was an  18th-century inn built by the Moravian community at Bethlehem, Pennsylvania to provide accommodations for non-Moravian merchants who had business with the community.  

Many American patriots prominent in launching and supporting the American Revolution stayed there, including George Washington, Martha Washington, Alexander Hamilton, Benjamin Franklin, John Adams, Samuel Adams, John Hancock, and the Marquis de Lafayette. On September 22, 1777 fourteen members of the Continental Congress signed the register and stayed overnight.

In 1758, the Moravian missionary community in Bethlehem was considered to be located at the western frontier of colonial America.

It was the Moravians’ official “Gasthaus” and its guests included Governors John and Richard Penn; Governor William Franklin of New Jersey; Sir William Johnson, British Commissioner of Indian Affairs; General Thomas Gage, Commander of the British forces in America; and James Allen, son of William Allen, the founder of Allentown.

Throughout the American war for independence, the Sun Inn hosted statesmen and military officers including Generals George Washington; Greene; Knox;  the Marquis de Lafayette; the Marquis de Chastellux; Horatio Gates; Benedict Arnold, and Ethan Allen; Count Casimir Pulaski and Baron Von Steuben; Captain John Paul Jones; Alexander Hamilton; and John Jay. [ref: http://paheritage.wpengine.com/article/sun-inn-restored]

According to the National Register Nomination form, members of the Continental Congress, including John Adams, Samuel Adams, Richard Henry Lee and John Hancock, stayed at the inn in 1777 when the British occupied Philadelphia.

The inn acquired an international reputation for its hospitality and accommodations, fine food and was one of the first inns to offer a private suite.  John Adams, President of the United States, stated that it is, “the best Inn I ever saw.”

In 1816, under the management of Christian Jacob Wolle a third story was added to the building with 17 new rooms. In 1866 the building was again enlarged, almost completely hiding the original inn. 

The inn claims the distinction of having lodged fifty-one chiefs and warriors of the Iroquois Nation, including Chief Cornplanter, the Seneca leader and orator.

After Washington's defeat at the Battle of Brandywine, much of the American army's baggage and stores were kept near the inn and many people fleeing Philadelphia stayed at the inn.  During Fries's Rebellion in 1799, seventeen of Fries's followers were held at the inn and then freed by Fries.

In the nineteenth century, the inn was altered and enlarged and continued to host famous visitors including Joseph Bonaparte, brother of Napoleon, who was a guest at the inn during the summer of 1821. In 1836, General William Henry Harrison, who was later the President of the United States, led a parade to the inn where he addressed townspeople.

The Sun Inn ceased operations as a hotel in 1961, two hundred years after receiving its original license. To save the inn from deterioration and demolition, the Sun Inn Preservation Association was created in 1971 to raise funds and acquire the property. The inn was added to the National Register of Historic Places in 1978.
The Sun Inn has been restored to its original eighteenth-century appearance and is back in operation as a museum, restaurant, tavern, and micro-distillery.

Gallery

References

External links
 Sun Inn, 564 Main Street, Bethlehem, Northampton County, PA: 5 measured drawings at Historic American Buildings Survey
 Sun Inn website

Hotel buildings on the National Register of Historic Places in Pennsylvania
Hotel buildings completed in 1758
Buildings and structures in Northampton County, Pennsylvania
Moravian settlement in Pennsylvania
National Register of Historic Places in Northampton County, Pennsylvania